Public School 166, the Richard Rodgers School of Arts & Technology, is a public school administered by the New York City Department of Education and located in the city's Upper West Side neighborhood of the borough of Manhattan.  An elementary school, it serves about 600 pupils in kindergarten through fifth grade.

The building, located on West 89th Street between Columbus and Amsterdam avenues, was designed by C. B. J. Snyder and opened in September 1899. It was completely renovated and modernized in 1995 and designated a New York City landmark in 2000. Although the school is still referred to as PS 166, it was formally renamed in honor of former student Richard Rodgers in 2003.

Notable alumni 
 Graham Diamond – Satire, fantasy, fiction and nonfiction author
 Joey Diaz – Comedian and actor
 Ronnie Eldridge – former New York City councilwoman
 Melissa Manchester – singer-songwriter
 Richard Rodgers – composer
 Lewis and Jack Rudin – Owners of the Rudin Management real estate development firm
 Jonas Salk – medical researcher and polio vaccine developer
 J. D. Salinger – novelist, author of Catcher in the Rye
 Edwin Schlossberg  – museum designer and husband of Caroline Kennedy
 Jeffrey Toobin – lawyer, author, and legal analyst for the New Yorker
Everett Raymond Kinstler, artist, notable portrait painter
Benjamin Netanyau – Former Israel Prime Minister

External links
 School website
 NYC Department of Education website with links to statistics and other information

References

Public elementary schools in Manhattan